MODISC may refer to:
 Magneto-optical disc, a computer storage medium introduced in 1985
 M-DISC, an archival type of recordable DVD or Blu-ray disc media